Jørgen is a Danish, Norwegian, and Faroese masculine given name cognate to George

People with the given name Jørgen 
 Jørgen Aall (1771–1833), Norwegian ship-owner and politician
 Jørgen Andersen (1886–1973), Norwegian gymnast
 Jørgen Aukland (born 1975), Norwegian cross-country skier
 Jørgen Beck (1914–1991), Danish film actor
 Jørgen Bentzon (1897–1951), Danish composer
 Jørgen Bjelke (1621–1696), Norwegian officer and nobleman
 Jørgen Bjørnstad (1894–1942), Norwegian gymnast
 Jørgen Bojsen-Møller (born 1954), Danish sailor and Olympic Champion
 Jørgen Thygesen Brahe (1515–1565), Danish nobleman
 Jørgen Brønlund (1877–1907), Greenlandic polar explorer, educator, and catechist
 Jørgen Bru (1881–1974) was a Norwegian sport shooter
 Jørgen Brunchorst (1862–1917), Norwegian natural scientist, politician and diplomat
 Jørgen Buckhøj (1935–1994), Danish actor
 Jørgen Wright Cappelen (1805–1878), Norwegian bookseller and publisher
 Jørgen Carling (born 1974), Norwegian researcher specializing on international migration
 Jørgen Emborg (born 1953), Danish jazz pianist and composer
 Jørgen Conrad de Falsen (1785–1849), Danish-Norwegian naval officer
 Jørgen Flood (1792–1867), Norwegian merchant and politician
 Jørgen Gammelgaard (1938–1991), Danish furniture designer
 Jørgen Pedersen Gram (1850–1916), Danish actuary and mathematician
 Jørgen Gry (1915–1993), Danish field hockey player
 Jørgen Hansen (disambiguation)
 Jørgen Haugan (born 1941), Norwegian author and lecturer
 Jørgen Holmboe (1902–1979), Norwegian-American meteorologist
 Jørgen von Cappelen Knudtzon (1784–1854), Norwegian businessman and patron of the arts
 Jørgen Ingmann (1925–2015), Danish musician
 Jørgen Jahre (1907–1998), Norwegian shipowner and sports official
 Jørgen Jalland (born 1977), Norwegian footballer
 Jørgen Jensen (disambiguation)
 Jørgen Jersild (1913–2004), Danish composer
 Jørgen Jørgensen (1780–1841), Danish adventurer
 Jørgen Juve (1906–1983), Norwegian football player, jurist, journalist and non-fiction writer
 Jørgen Kaas (1618-1658), a Danish colonel and lord of the fiefdom Lister in Norway
 Jørgen Kastholm (1931–2007), Danish furniture designer
 Jørgen Kieler (born 1919), a Danish physician and resistance member
 Jørgen Kiil 1931–2003), Danish actor
 Jørgen Hansen Koch (1787–1860), Danish Neoclassical architect
 Jørgen Kosmo (born 1947), Norwegian politician
 Jørgen Kristensen (born 1946), nicknamed Troldmanden (the Wizard), Danish football player
 Jørgen Landt (c. 1751–1804), Danish priest, botanist and author
 Jørgen Langhelle (born 1965), Norwegian actor
 Jørgen Leth (born 1937), Danish poet and film director
 Jørgen Lindegaard (born 1948), Danish businessman
 Jørgen Løvland (1848–1922), Norwegian politician and prime minister
 Jørgen Mathiesen (1901–1993), Norwegian landowner and businessman
 Jørgen Meinich (1820–1911), Norwegian jurist and industrialist
 Jørgen Moe (1813–1882), Norwegian folklorist, bishop and author
 Jørgen Nash (1920–2004), Danish artist, writer and central proponent of situationism
 Jørgen Niclasen (born 1969), Faroese politician
 Jørgen Nielsen (disambiguation)
 Jørgen Olesen (1924–1999), Danish footballer
 Jørgen V. Pedersen (born 1959), Danish road bicycle racer
 Jørgen Randers (born 1945), Norwegian academic and practitioner in the field of future studies
 Jørgen Rantzau (1652–1713), Danish military officer
 Jørgen Rasmussen (disambiguation)
 Jørgen Ravn (born 1940), Danish footballer
 Jørgen Reenberg (born 1927), Danish film actor
 Jørgen Rischel (1934–2007), Danish linguist
 Jørgen Roed, (1808–1888), Danish portrait and genre painter
 Jørgen Rømer, (1923–2007), Danish art historian, graphic artist and painter
 Jørgen Ryg (1927–1981), Danish comedian, jazz musician and actor
 Jørgen Matthias Christian Schiødte (1815–1884), Danish entomologist
 Jørgen Skjelvik (born 1991), Norwegian footballer
 Jørgen Slots, Danish periodontist and professor of dentistry and microbiology
 Jørgen Leschly Sørensen (1922–1999), Danish footballer
 Jørgen Stubberud (1883–1980), Norwegian polar explorer
 Jørgen Johan Tandberg (1816–1885), Norwegian bishop and politician
 Jørgen Tengesdal (born 1979), Norwegian football manager
 Jørgen Thorup (born 1950), Danish fencer
 Jørgen Vogt (1900–1972), Norwegian newspaper editor and politician
 Jørgen Herman Vogt (1784–1862), Norwegian politician
 Jørgen Weel (1922–1993), Danish film actor

See also
 Jörgen (disambiguation)
 Jurgen (disambiguation)
 Göran

Danish masculine given names
Faroese masculine given names
Norwegian masculine given names